Charles J. Volpe (November 29, 1936 – September 22, 1988) was a Republican member of the Pennsylvania House of Representatives.

References

Republican Party members of the Pennsylvania House of Representatives
1988 deaths
1936 births
20th-century American politicians